State Road 246 is an east–west road in the southwest portion of the U.S. state of Indiana.

Route description
State Road 246 begins in the small town of Prairie Creek at State Road 63.  Going east, it crosses U.S. Route 41 just north of Farmersburg.  It veers slightly south in order to pass through Lewis where it is concurrent with State Road 159, then jogs north again to hit Middlebury and Clay City where it is concurrent with State Road 59.  Continuing east, it winds to the northeast to pass through Patricksburg, then runs directly east to State Road 46 at Vandalia.

State Road 46, its parent route, angles northwest to Terre Haute from Vandalia, whereas State Road 246 goes west.

Major intersections

References

External links

246
Transportation in Clay County, Indiana
Transportation in Owen County, Indiana
Transportation in Vigo County, Indiana